Cinderella Jones is a 1946 American musical comedy film directed by Busby Berkeley and written by Charles Hoffman. The film stars Joan Leslie, Robert Alda, Julie Bishop, William Prince, S. Z. Sakall, and Edward Everett Horton. The film was released by Warner Bros. on March 9, 1946.

Plot
Struggling singer Judy Jones (Leslie) discovers she's entitled to a multimillion-dollar fortune, as long as she can live up to the terms of her late uncle's will. To collect her inheritance, Jones must marry an intellectual genius. Jones ditches her boyfriend, bandleader Tommy Coles (Alda), and matriculates at an elite university for the super-intelligent. On campus, Jones struggles to win the heart of a dashing professor, Bartholomew Williams (Prince).

Cast 
 Joan Leslie as Judy Jones
 Robert Alda as Tommy Coles
 Julie Bishop as Camille
 William Prince as Bart Williams
 S. Z. Sakall as Gabriel Popik
 Edward Everett Horton as Keating 
 Charles Dingle as Minland
 Ruth Donnelly as Cora Elliot
 Elisha Cook, Jr. as Oliver S. Patch
 Hobart Cavanaugh as George
 Charles Arnt as Mahoney
 Chester Clute as Krencher
 Edward Gargan as Riley
 Margaret Early as Bashful Girl
 Johnny Mitchell as Soldier
 Mary Dean as Singer
 Monte Blue as Jailer
 Marianne O'Brien as Marie
 Marion Martin as Burlesque Queen

Reception
Bosley Crowther of The New York Times said, "If you can imagine a combination of a Nineteen Thirties "college musical" and a second-rate silent slapstick shot completely "off the cuff," then you can picture in your mind's eye the Warners' Cinderella Jones, a little package of fluff and painful cut-ups which came to the Strand yesterday. And we trust that you can so imagine, for it would be very difficult indeed to convey a more accurate impression of this nonsensical and amateurish film."

References

External links

 
 
 
 

1946 films
Warner Bros. films
American musical comedy-drama films
1940s musical comedy-drama films
Films directed by Busby Berkeley
Films based on works by Philip Wylie
Films scored by Friedrich Hollaender
1946 comedy films
1946 drama films
1940s English-language films
1940s American films